Uchumayo or Uchumayu (Quechua uchu capsicum, mayu river) is one of twenty-nine districts of the province Arequipa in Peru.

See also 
 Añaswayq'u

References

External links

Districts of the Arequipa Province
Districts of the Arequipa Region